Shohratgarh is a constituency of the Uttar Pradesh Legislative Assembly covering the city of Shohratgarh in the Siddharth Nagar district of Uttar Pradesh, India.

Shohratgarh is one of five assembly constituencies in the Domariyaganj Lok Sabha constituency. Since 2008, this assembly constituency is numbered 302 amongst 403 constituencies.

Members of the Legislative Assembly

Election results

2022

2017
Apna Dal (Sonelal) candidate Amar Singh Chaudhary won in 2017 Uttar Pradesh Legislative Elections defeating Bahujan Samaj Party candidate Mohd Jameel by a margin of 22,124 votes.

16th Vidhan Sabha: 2012 General Elections

References

External links
 

Siddharthnagar district
Assembly constituencies of Uttar Pradesh